Legros de Rumigny (1710–1770) was a French hairdresser. He was the hairdresser for the French court of the 18th century including Madame de Pompadour.

According to later accounts, Rumigny was discovered to have raped a number of his clients. Although accusations were made against him during his lifetime, they were dismissed by the royal court and he was never formally charged.

References

French hairdressers
18th-century French businesspeople
1710 births
1770 deaths